Hamshahri may refer to:
 Hamshahri, a major national Iranian Persian-language newspaper published by the Municipality of Tehran
 Hamshahri Corpus, a sizable Persian corpus based on the Iranian newspaper Hamshahri
 Hamshahri (film), a 1983 Iranian documentary film directed by Abbas Kiarostami